A Nightmare on Elm Street is a 1984 horror film.

A Nightmare on Elm Street may also refer to:
A Nightmare on Elm Street (franchise), a media franchise begun with the film
A Nightmare on Elm Street (comics), several comics series based on the films
A Nightmare on Elm Street (video game), a 1989 video game based on the films
A Nightmare on Elm Street (2010 film), a remake of the original film
Freddy's Nightmares: A Nightmare on Elm Street: The Series, a television series that aired from 1988 to 1990

See also
 
 
 
 Elm Street (disambiguation)
 List of A Nightmare on Elm Street media
 A Wet Dream on Elm Street, a 2010 pornographic film